The Oslo Bowl is the ninth studio album of Norwegian rock band Bigbang. It was released in March 2013.

Track list
"Like Americans Do" (4:44)
"Little Heart Bomb" (3:05)
"The Oslo Bowl" (3:05)
"Lazy Eye" (3:54)
"Love Today" (4:39)
"In the Evening" (4:51)
"Dandelions" (3:56)
"No Place Nowhere" (3:06)
"Black Lights" (3:11)
"The World Is a Drumkit" (3:07)
"Song" (4:19)

Personnel
Bigbang
Øystein Greni - Lead vocals, guitars.
Nikolai Hængsle Eilertsen - Bass
Olaf Olsen - Drums

Guest musicians
Lissie
Gillian Welch
David Rawlings
Joseph Zigaboo Modeliste
Tuva Syvertsen
Erik Sollid

References

2013 albums
Bigbang (Norwegian band) albums